INS Vishal, also known as Indigenous Aircraft Carrier 2 (IAC-2), is a planned aircraft carrier to be built by Cochin Shipyard Limited for the Indian Navy. It is intended to be the second aircraft carrier to be built in India after  (IAC-1). The proposed design of the second carrier class will be a new design, featuring significant changes from Vikrant, including an increase in size and displacement. An Electromagnetic Aircraft Launch System (EMALS) CATOBAR system is also under consideration. Its name Vishal means 'grand' in Sanskrit.

Design and Development
In April 2011, Admiral Nirmal Kumar Verma claimed that construction of the second carrier was some years away as there were a number of higher spending priorities for the navy. The design stage of IAC-2 began in 2012, and was undertaken by the navy's Naval Design Bureau. The navy decided not to seek outside help in preparing the design concept and implementation plans, but might seek help from the Russian Design Bureau later to integrate Russian aircraft into Vishal. IAC-2 is proposed to be a flat-top carrier with a displacement of 65,000 tonnes and might have a CATOBAR system, unlike the STOBAR system on IAC-1. In 2013, the Indian Navy reportedly sought to equip the aircraft carrier with EMALS, which could enable the launching of larger aircraft as well as unmanned combat aerial vehicles. General Atomics, the developer of EMALS, also gave a briefing of the technology to Indian Navy officers with the permission of the US Government.

In May 2015, Chief of the Naval Staff Admiral Robin K. Dhowan initially floated the possibility of nuclear propulsion, saying that "all options are open for the second indigenous aircraft carrier. Nothing has been ruled out." On 13 May 2015, Defence Acquisition Council (DAC) allotted Rs.30 crore for initial construction planning process of INS Vishal.

The initial plan for the aircraft carrier included nuclear propulsion system, but this was later changed to an integrated electric propulsion system due to the complexities involved in developing a nuclear reactor with a capacity of 500 to 550 megawatts that would possibly take 15 to 20 years.

In April 2015, US Under Secretary of Defense for Acquisition and Sustainment Frank Kendall stated that the Obama administration was supportive of selling EMALS to India, amongst other technologies. The Indian Navy also reached out to four international defence companies for suggestions with the design of Vishal, with letters of request sent to the British BAE Systems, French DCNS, American Lockheed Martin and Russian Rosoboronexport on 15 July 2015, according to a report in Jane's Navy International. The letter asked the companies to "provide technical and costing proposals" for the IAC-2 program.

A Joint Working Group on Aircraft Carrier Cooperation was also formed between India and the United States to collaborate on the design and development of aircraft carriers, with the first meeting between Indian Navy and United States Navy naval officers held in August 2015. In October 2017, just ahead of US Secretary of State Rex Tillerson's visit to India, the Trump administration approved the release of technology for the EMALS for Vishal.

On 3 December 2018, Chief of the Naval Staff Sunil Lanba told media that the work on Vishal had moved ahead and the construction of the ship is expected to begin in 3 years. Initially, the carrier was expected to enter service by the 2020s, but the expected date of completion was later postponed to the 2030s.

In April 2021, the Indian Navy, wanting to give preference to nuclear powered and conventional submarines in future sea-warfare, has decided that it will now begin planning the third aircraft carrier, INS Vishal, as a replacement for the serving .

In November 2021, the Indian Navy began discussions on tweaking the designs to accommodate both unmanned and manned aircraft. A slight reduction in size (from the current 65000 tons) was being discussed to reduce weight, cost and time to build the carrier.

In April 2022, state-owned BHEL signed a Memorandum of Understanding with GE Power Conversion, a British-French enterprise now owned by General Electric (as part of the Power and Propulsion Sub-Alliance, which is made up of General Electric Power Conversion, Thales UK, L3 Communications and Rolls-Royce). The purpose of the MoU is to boost indigenous capabilities in developing an Integrated Full Electric Propulsion System (IFEP) for the Indian Navy, including one for the planned aircraft carrier.

Carrier Air Wing Organization
It's estimated that the carrier air wing of INS Vishal could consist of carrier-based HAL TEDBF and naval version of HAL AMCA. There's also a high possibility of operating Mikoyan MiG-29Ks and other carrier-based aircraft at the initial stage of INS Vishal. Naval planners believe that with INS Vishal likely to enter service in the early 2030s, they should plan on operating UCAVs, as well as a fixed wing ASW and AEW&C aircraft and  medium and light fighters. According to a naval planner, it "could greatly expand our mission envelope with UCAVs, using the pilot-less aircraft for high-risk reconnaissance and suppression of enemy air defences (SEAD). Mid-air refuelling would let us keep UCAVs on a mission for 24–36 hours continuously, since pilot fatigue would not be a factor."

See also
 Future of the Indian Navy

References 

Proposed aircraft carriers
Vehicles introduced in 2015